KPNS may refer to:

 Kildare Place National School
 KPNS (AM), a radio station (1350 AM) licensed to Duncan, Oklahoma, United States
 the ICAO code for Pensacola International Airport